TDS Telecom  is an American telecommunications company with headquarters in Madison, Wisconsin. It is a wholly owned subsidiary of Telephone and Data Systems Inc, and is the seventh-largest local exchange carrier in the U.S. TDS Telecom offers telephone, broadband Internet and television services to customers in thirty states and more than 900 rural and suburban communities, though it also serves some urban metropolitan communities. It also sells businesses communications services including VoIP (managed IP hosted) phone service, dedicated broadband Internet and hosted-managed services. With headquarters in Madison, TDS Telecom operates  TDS Broadband LLC, and BendBroadband, and TDS Metrocom, LLC. Combined, the company employs nearly 3,300 people.  In 2019, TDS Telecom and parent company TDS Inc. celebrated 50 years in business.

TDS Telecom is a participant in the FCC's Connect America Fund, also known as A-CAM. With this funding TDS is on a ten-year push to bring high speed internet to the furthest reaches of its rural serving areas. Depending on location, the vast majority of TDS customers in eligible rural areas are expected to receive broadband speeds of 25Mbit/s download and 3 Mbit/s upload (25/3). The remaining customers are expected to receive broadband speeds at 10/1 and 4/1Mbit/s. In less rural areas, TDS provides much higher broadband speeds, from 100 Mbps to 8 Gbps.

More recently, TDS has been launching new fiber to the home services across Wisconsin and Idaho. New markets in Wisconsin include: Deforest, Windsor, McFarland, Monona Grove, Cottage Grove, Oregon and Merrimac communities, all within Dane County Wisconsin. In Idaho the communities of Coeur d'Alene, Rathdrum, Hayden, Post Falls, all within Kootenai County. These services are offered by TDS through CLEC TDS Metrocom, LLC which is operated by TDS Telecom. Fiber to the home markets are 1 Gigabit speed markets with multiple speed offerings available to customers.

Subsidiaries
Subsidiaries include:

Butler Telephone Co., Butler, Alabama
Oakman Telephone Co., Oakman, Alabama
Peoples Telephone Co., Centre, Alabama
Cleveland County Tel. Co., Rison, Arkansas
Decatur Telephone Co., Decatur, Arkansas
Arizona Telephone Co., Quartzsite, Arizona
Southwestern Telephone Co., Quartzsite, Arizona
Happy Valley Telephone Co., Olinda, California 
Hornitos Telephone Co., Olinda, California
Winterhaven Telephone Co., Winterhaven, California
Delta County Tele-Comm, Paonia, Colorado
Strasburg Telephone Co., Strasburg, Colorado
Quincy Telephone Co.,  Quincy, Florida (also serves Attapulgus, Georgia)
Blue Ridge Telephone Co., Blue Ridge, Georgia
Camden Telephone & Telegraph Co., St. Mary's, Georgia
Nelson-Ball Ground Telephone Co., Nelson, Georgia
Potlatch Telephone Co., Potlatch, Idaho
Camden Telephone Co., Camden, Indiana
Comm. Corp. of Indiana, Whitestown, Indiana
Comm. Corp. of Southern Indiana, Poseyville, Indiana
Home Company of Pittsboro, Pittsboro, Indiana
Home Telephone Co., Waldron, Indiana
Merchants & Farmers Telephone Co., Hillsboro, Indiana
S & W Telephone Co., Sandborn, Indiana
Tipton Telephone, Tipton, Indiana
Tri-County Telephone Co., New Richmond, Indiana
West Point Telephone Co.,  West Point, Indiana
Leslie County Telephone Co., Hyden, Kentucky
Lewisport Telephone Co., Lewisport, Kentucky
Salem Telephone Co., Salem, Kentucky
Cobbosseecontee Tel. Co., North Anson, Maine
Hampden Telephone Co., Hampden, Maine
Hartland & St. Albans Tel. Co., Hartland, Maine
Somerset Telephone Co., North Anson, Maine
The Island Telephone Co., Warren, Maine
Warren Telephone Co., Warren, Maine
West Penobscot Tel. & Tele. Co., Corinna, Maine
Chatham Telephone Co., Chatham, Michigan
Communication Corporation of Michigan, Augusta, Michigan
Island Telephone Co., Sanford, Michigan
Shiawassee Telephone Co., Perry, Michigan
Wolverine Telephone Co., Millington, Michigan
Arvig Telephone Co., Pequot Lakes, Minnesota
Bridge Water Telephone Co., Monticello, Minnesota
Mid-State Telephone Co., New London, Minnesota
Winsted Telephone Company, Winsted, Minnesota
Calhoun City Telephone Co., Calhoun, Mississippi
Myrtle Telephone Co. Myrtle, Mississippi
Southeast Miss. Tel. Co., Leakesville, Mississippi
Contoocook Valley Tel. Co., Contoocook, New Hampshire
Hollis Telephone Co., Hollis, New Hampshire
Kearsarge Telephone Co., Kearsarge, New Hampshire
Merrimack County Telephone, Contoocook, New Hampshire
Union Telephone Co., Farmington, New Hampshire
Wilton Telephone Company, Wilton, New Hampshire
Deposit Telephone Co., Deposit, New York
Edwards Telephone Co., Edwards, New York
Oriskany Falls Telephone Corporation, Vernon, New York
Port Byron Telephone Co., Port Byron, New York
Township Telephone Co., Chaumont, New York
Vernon Telephone Co., Vernon, New York
Arcadia Telephone Co.,  Arcadia, Ohio
Continental Telephone Co., Continental, Ohio
Little Miami Communications Corporation, Fayetteville, Ohio
Oakwood Telephone Company, Oakwood, Ohio
The Vanlue Telephone Company, Vanlue, Ohio
Mid-America Telephone Co., Stonewall, Oklahoma
Wyandotte Telephone Co., Wyandotte, Oklahoma
BendBroadBand Company,  Bend, Oregon
Mahanoy & Mahantango Tel. Co., Herndon, Pennsylvania
Sugar Valley Telephone Co., Loganton, Pennsylvania
McClellanville Telephone Co., McClellanville, South Carolina
Norway Telephone Company, North, South Carolina
St. Stephen Telephone Co., St. Stephen, South Carolina
Williston Telephone Co.,  Williston, South Carolina
Concord Telephone Exchange, Farragut, Tennessee
Humphreys County Tel., New Johnsonville, Tennessee
Tellico Telephone Co., Tellico Plains, Tennessee
Tennessee Telephone Co., Parsons, Tennessee
Amelia Telephone Corp., Amelia, Virginia
New Castle Telephone Co., New Castle, Virginia
Virginia Telephone Co., Hot Springs, Virginia
Ludlow Telephone Company, Ludlow, Vermont
Northfield Telephone Co., Northfield, Vermont
Perkinsville Telephone Co., Perkinsville, Vermont
Asotin Telephone Co., Asotin, Washington (also serves Oregon)
Lewis River Telephone Co., La Center, Washington
McDaniel Telephone Company, Salkum, Washington
Badger Telecom, Neillsville, Wisconsin
Black Earth Telephone Co., Black Earth, Wisconsin
Bonduel Telephone Co., Bonduel, Wisconsin
Burlington, Brighton, & Wheatland Telephone Company, New Munster, Wisconsin
Central State Telephone Co., Vesper, Wisconsin
Dickeyville Telephone, Dickeyville, Wisconsin
EastCoast Telecom, Valders, Wisconsin
The Farmers Telephone Co., Lancaster, Wisconsin
Grantland Telecom, Fennimore, Wisconsin
Mid-Plains Telephone, Middleton, Wisconsin
Merrimac Communications - Merrimac, Wisconsin
Midway Telephone Co., Medford, Wisconsin
Mosinee Telephone Co., Mosinee, Wisconsin
Mt. Vernon Telephone Co., Verona, Wisconsin
Riverside Telecom, Reeseville, Wisconsin
Scandinavia Telephone Co., Iola, Wisconsin
Southeast Telephone Co., Waterford, Wisconsin
State Long Distance Telcom, Elkhorn, Wisconsin
UTELCO, Monroe, Wisconsin
Waunakee Telephone Co., Waunakee, Wisconsin
Stockbridge & Sherwood Telephone Company, Sherwood, Wisconsin
Tenney Telephone Co., Alma, Wisconsin

See also
List of United States telephone companies

References

External links

Telecommunications companies of the United States
Internet service providers of the United States
Companies based in Madison, Wisconsin
Telecommunications companies established in 1969
1969 establishments in Wisconsin